Long Plays 83-87 is the first compilation album released by Australian new wave band, Pseudo Echo. It was released in 1987. It included extended and dance versions of their previously released singles between 1983-1987. It was released on CD in 1990.

It was released in New Zealand under the title FunkyTown - The album.

Reviews
Michael Sutton of Allmusic gave the album 4 out of 5 stars, saying: This compilation shows that in the '80s Pseudo Echo was able to combine dance music and rock & roll as deftly as its Australian peers in INXS. Singer Brian Canham may not have had the snake-like charm of INXS' Michael Hutchence, but his brooding voice makes these songs sound more mysterious than they normally would. The lyrics are often superficial and repetitive; however, the hooks are dynamite. Pseudo Echo just wanted to get bodies gyrating, and Long Plays 83-87 offers the perfect way to get into the groove.

Track listings
 Australian 'Long Plays 83–87' 

 New Zealand 'Funky Town'

Charts
Long Plays 83-87 peaked at No.44 in Australia; however, Funky Town - The Album was much more successful in New Zealand, where it debuted at No.4 and peaked at No.1. It remained at No.1 for 3 consecutive weeks during April 1987.

Weekly charts

Credits
 Brian Canham
 Pierre Pierre
 James Leigh
 Vince Leigh
 Tony Lugton
 Anthony Argiro

See also
List of number-one albums from the 1980s (New Zealand)

References

Pseudo Echo albums
1987 remix albums
EMI Records albums
Albums produced by Peter Dawkins (musician)